Giselle Itié Ramos (born October 3, 1981) is a Mexican-born Brazilian actress. In 2001, she started her career as an actress in a Brazilian telenovela. In 2009, she debuted as protagonist in the telenovela Bela, a Feia, the Brazilian version for the Colombian Yo soy Betty, la fea. Itié also took part in the film The Expendables, co-written, directed by and starring Sylvester Stallone.

Biography 
Giselle was born in Mexico City on 3 October 1982 to a Mexican father and a Brazilian mother from São Paulo. Her father and mother lost everything in the earthquake that destroyed Mexico City in 1985.  Thereafter, she moved with her family to her mother's native Brazil.

Giselle lied to her family to pursue her artistic career; telling her father that she needed money to pay for a gym membership, she instead spent the money on a theater course at Televisa, the leading television station in Mexico. For eight months the actress stayed at the home of relatives in Mexico, convinced that she wanted to continue pursuing an acting career.

Career 

Her long standing desire to work as an actress finally came true at age 18. Disheartened by her modeling career, she signed up for an audition for the miniseries Os Maias after much insistence by an employee of Elite Model Management. Two months later, after auditioning for the Rede Globo miniseries Engraçadinha: Seus Amores e Seus Pecados, based on a novel by Nelson Rodrigues, she received a communiqué from the broadcaster confirming her in the role of Lola in the miniseries. The character in question was a courtesan, forcing Itié to forgo her shyness during some risqué scenes. Still, Giselle was frustrated after Os Maias. Although she expected the series to be renewed in global production, it wasn't.

The same year, she accepted an audition for Pícara Sonhadora, adapted from the original Mexican production and revived the core of SBT TV dramas. Gisele won the role of the villainess Bárbara, lover of the protagonist played by Petrônio Gontijo.

She was then called by the director Luiz Fernando Carvalho who offered her the role of the character Eulália in the novela Esperança in 2002.

In 2004, she was one of the protagonists of the novela Começar de Novo and in 2005, she appeared in the TV series Mandrake for HBO Brazil. In 2006, she was also one of the protagonists of the show Avassaladoras. In the same year, she acted in the novela Pé na Jaca.

In 2007, she appeared on the show O Mistério da Estrada de Sintra. That same year she acted in the telenovela O Profeta and appeared on the third edition of the segment of the show Domingão do Faustão called "Dança no Gelo". It was going well, getting featured in the program, but a head injury forced her to quit. The actress subsequently made a full recovery from the injury.

In 2008, she participated in several episodes of the series Casos e Acasos and Faça Sua História.

In 2009, she worked on the movie Inversão directed by Edu Felistoque. That same year, the actress was the protagonist of the telenovela Bela, a Feia aired by Rede Record.

The following year, the film The Expendables premiered, in which she played Sandra, opposite Sylvester Stallone.

In 2012, she was one of the protagonists of the telenovela Máscaras produced by Rede Record. It was the same year in two foreign films, On the Road of Walter Salles Jr., and was the film's protagonist Chilean Caleuche: El llamado del mar.

Between 2015 and 2016, she played Zipporah in Os Dez Mandamentos.

Personal life 
In 2014, Itié married actor Emilio Dantas. In the same year, she had to leave the cast of Vitória, where she would have played the character Renata (which was subsequently interpreted by Maytê Piragibe), due to a motorcycle accident during their honeymoon in Thailand. In 2015, she and  actor Emilio Dantas separated. On November 11, 2015, Itié began a relationship with the actor Guilherme Winter.

Filmography

Television

Film

References

External links

Living people
Actresses from Mexico City
Actresses of Mexican descent
Mexican people of Brazilian descent
Mexican actresses
Mexican emigrants to Brazil
Brazilian telenovela actresses
Brazilian television actresses
Brazilian film actresses
Brazilian people of Mexican descent
1981 births